Kathleen C. Tomlinson (born September 29, 1988) is an American politician. She is a Republican in the Pennsylvania House of Representatives. In 2020, Tomlinson was elected to represent District 18, which encompasses a portion of Bucks County.

Background
Tomlinson is a lifelong-resident of Bensalem. She is the daughter of Pennsylvania State Senator Tommy Tomlinson, and is a third-generation funeral director at their family-run funeral home in Bensalem.

Political career

Tomlinson defeated Harold Hayes in a special election that was held March 17, 2020, to replace Gene DiGirolamo, who had resigned to become a Bucks County commissioner. She assumed office on April 6, 2020.

Tomlinson sought re-election in the general election held November 3, 2020, and again defeated Hayes to retain her seat for a two-year term. On January 29, 2021, she was named chair of the Pennsylvania House Human Services Subcommittee on Drugs and Alcohol.

Committee assignments 

 Children & Youth
 Gaming Oversight, Secretary
 Human Services, Subcommittee on Drugs and Alcohol - Chair
 Urban Affairs

References

External links
Official Pennsylvania House profile

Republican Party members of the Pennsylvania House of Representatives
Women state legislators in Pennsylvania
Living people
Mercer County Community College alumni
21st-century American women
1988 births